This is a list of airlines currently operating in the Republic of the Congo:

See also
List of airlines
List of defunct airlines of Africa

Congo, Republic of the
Airlines
 
Congo, Republic of the
Airlines